Mike Bradwell (born July 11, 1986) is a former Canadian football wide receiver who played for the Toronto Argonauts of the Canadian Football League. He was drafted in the second round of the 2008 CFL Draft by the Toronto Argonauts. He began playing football in his final year at Leaside High School and played CIS football with McMaster University.

Personal life
Bradwell enjoys watching movies and golfing in his free time and is a strong supporter of the Sian Bradwell Fund For Children With Cancer. He has two older siblings, Dave, a PhD graduate from M.I.T., and Suzanne, an emergency department doctor in St. Catharines. Bradwell majored in civil engineering at McMaster University and works as a field co-op student with PCL Constructors during the off-season.

References

External links
Toronto Argonauts bio
 

1986 births
Living people
Canadian football wide receivers
Toronto Argonauts players
Players of Canadian football from Ontario
McMaster Marauders football players
Sportspeople from Toronto